Qooney is a town in the Gedo region of southwest  Somalia.

References
Qooney, Somalia

Populated places in Gedo